Triple J is an Australian government-funded national radio station that has been broadcasting since 1975. The following is a list of radio presenters on the station.

Current presenters

Past presenters (1994 onwards)

Presenters (1975–1994)

 Glenn A. Baker
 Tony Barrell
 Tony Biggs (Tony Biggs Show, 1980s)
 Mac Cocker (father of Jarvis Cocker)
 Jonathan Coleman
 Mark Colvin
 Maynard (Mornings, early 1990s)
 Lance Curtis (The Jay Team, comedian)
 Vic Davies (Club Veg, 1980s)
 Arnold Frolows (Ambience, 1980s)
 Bob Hudson
 Alan Knight
 Sandy McCutcheon
 Lex Marinos
 Stuart Matchett
 Mark Dodshon
 Doug Mulray
 Ted Robinson
 Ian Rogerson

See also
 List of programs broadcast by Triple J

Notes

References

External links